Serenay Öziri (born 21 December 1994) is a Turkish women's football defender currently playing in the First League for Fatih Vatan Spor with jersey number 4. She was a member of the Turkey girls' U-17 and Turkey women's U-19 teams.

Personal life
Serenay Öziri was born in Gölcük, Kocaeli, Turkey on 21 December 1994. She studies physical education teaching at Kocaeli University.

Playing career
Öziri played football at a very young age with her elder brother. She then played on the street with boys. She began competitive football playing when her physical education teacher formed a girls' team at her school.

She played for her school team of Kocaeli Karşıyaka High School at the 2011 ISF World School Football Championship held in Fortaleza, Brazil. Her team became the runner-up losing to the German team in the final. She became the top scorer of the tournament.

Although playing in the midfield, she is well known for her long-distance goals.

Club

Öziri obtained her license from her hometown's club Gölcükspor on 10 June 2008.  After playing two seasons in the Women's Second League with her team, she appeared in the Women's First League in the 2010–11 season following her team's promotion. She then transferred to İzmit Belediyespor. After one season, she was with İzmit Çenesuyu Plajyoluspor again in the Second League. Her next transfer went to Derince Belediyespor in the second half of the 2012–13 season to appear in the First League. She then transferred to the Istanbul-based Second League playing club Kireçburnu Spor in the 2014–15 season, and enjoyed her team's promotion to the First League at the end of the season. After playing three seasons in total, Öziri signed with Kdz. Ereğlispor for the 2017–18 season.

By October 2019, she transferred to the Istanbul-based club Fatih Vatan Spor.

International
Öziri was admitted to the Turkey girls' national U-17 team, and debuted at the 2010 UEFA Women's Under-17 Championship – First qualifying round against Denmark on 10 October 2009. She took part also at the 2011 UEFA Women's Under-17 Championship – First qualifying round. She was capped six times in total for the Turkey U-17 team.

She joined the  Turkey women's national U-19 playing at the 2013 UEFA Women's U-19 Championship First qualifying round – Group 5 match against Norway on 20 October 2012. She was capped in two games.

Futsal
In 2018, she was a member of her alma mata's futsal team, which became champion of the Turkish Intra-University Women's Futsal Super League.

Career statistics
.

Honours
 Turkish Women's Second League
 Gölcükspor
 Winners (1): 2009–10

 Kireçburnu Spor
 Winners (1): 2014–15

References

External links

Living people
1994 births
People from Gölcük
Kocaeli University alumni
Turkish women's footballers
Women's association football defenders
Turkish women's futsal players
Gölcükspor players
Derince Belediyespor women's players
Kireçburnu Spor
Karadeniz Ereğlispor players
Fatih Vatan Spor players
21st-century Turkish sportswomen